Kornerupine (also called Prismatine) is a rare boro-silicate mineral with the chemical formula . It crystallizes in the orthorhombic - dipyramidal crystal system as brown, green, yellow to colorless slender tourmaline like prisms or in massive fibrous forms. It has a Mohs hardness of 7 and a specific gravity of 3.3 to 3.34. Its indices of refraction are nα=1.660 - 1.671, nβ=1.673 - 1.683 and nγ=1.674 - 1.684.

It occurs in boron-rich volcanic and sedimentary rocks which have undergone high grade metamorphism. It is also found in metamorphosed anorthosite complexes.

Kornerupine is valued as a gemstone when it is found in translucent green to yellow shades. The emerald green varieties are especially sought after. It forms a solid solution series with prismatine. Strongly pleochroic, it appears green or reddish brown when viewed from different directions. It has a vitreous luster. 

It was first described in 1884 for an occurrence in Fiskernæs in southwest Greenland. It was named in honor of the Danish geologist, Andreas Nikolaus Kornerup  (1857–1883). Although kornerupine was named in 1884, it was not until 1912 that gem-quality material was found and it remains uncommon to this day. 

Deposits are found in Burma (Myanmar), Canada (Quebec), Kenya, Madagascar, Sri Lanka, Tanzania, and South Africa.

References

Mineral galleries

Sorosilicates
Orthorhombic minerals
Minerals in space group 63
Gemstones